Helsinki Art Museum, abbreviated as HAM, is an art museum in Helsinki, Finland. It is located in Tennispalatsi in Kamppi. The museum reopened after renovations and rebranding (as HAM) in 2015.

The museum is owned and operated by the city of Helsinki. It looks after the city's art collection, containing over 9,000 works. Nearly half of these are on display in public places such as parks, streets, schools and libraries.

The art museum hosts a small permanent exhibition of the works of Tove Jansson, including two large frescoes originally created for the restaurant of Helsinki City Hall.

The director of Helsinki Art Museum since 2013 is Maija Tanninen-Mattila.

See also
 Finnish National Gallery
 Ateneum
 Kiasma
 Sinebrychoff Art Museum
 Amos Anderson Art Museum

References

External links
HAM Helsinki Art Museum

Museums in Helsinki
Art museums and galleries in Finland
Kamppi